Erhan Altın (born 28 August 1956) is a Turkish football manager and former player who is currently the manager of Kocaelispor.

Career
Altin had managed Çanspor (1996–1997) and Kocaelispor (2009). Before retiring in 1990, he also played professionally as a midfielder for several clubs, including Taçspor (1966–1976), Fenerbahçe (1976–1979), Göztepe (1979–1982) and Kocaelispor (1982–1990). In addition, he earned one cap for the Turkey national football team in 1981 in a match against the USSR.

Altin was a coach (manager assistant) in Eskişehirspor, Kocaelispor (1999–2001), Diyarbakırspor (2003), Elazığspor (2003–2004), Akçaabat Sebatspor (2005), Çaykur Rizespor (2005–2007), Denizlispor (2007–2008) and Bursaspor (2008–2009).

References

External links
 
  (as coach)
 
 Erhan Altın at Footballdatabase

1956 births
Living people
People from Samsun
Turkish footballers
Turkey international footballers
Fenerbahçe S.K. footballers
Göztepe S.K. footballers
Kocaelispor footballers
Turkish football managers
Süper Lig managers
Kocaelispor managers
Samsunspor managers
Denizlispor managers
Association football defenders